Acantholipes namacensis is a species of moth in the family Erebidae. It is found in Angola, Ethiopia, Mozambique and South Africa.

References

namacensis
Moths described in 1852
Moths of Africa
Taxa named by Achille Guenée